Good Friends is singer-songwriter Livingston Taylor's ninth album, released in 1993.

The album is full of skillfully crafted pop songs and classics with a jazzy twist. Taylor includes several cover songs along with his own, self-penned, material. His cover of Bill Withers' "Grandma's Hands" takes the original's simple arrangement (just a bluesy electric guitar, bass and drums behind Wither's voice) and recreates the song into a gospel-choir backed a cappella performance. Based on the lyrics, the Grandma of this song was a religious woman who “clapped in church on Sunday morning” and “played a tambourine so well.” He also tackles the Wizard of Oz selections, "If I Only Had a Brain" and "Somewhere Over the Rainbow". Keeping with the Chesky Records standards, as the back-cover reads, this album was "recorded with minimalist miking techniques and without overdubbing or artificial enhancement to ensure the purest and most natural sound possible."

Track listing
All tracks composed by Livingston Taylor, except where indicated.

"Out of This World" (Livingston Taylor, Maggie Taylor) – 2:45
"Jacques Cousteau" (Andy Paley) – 2:17
"Heart and Soul" (Hoagy Charmichael, Frank Loesser) – 2:42
"Carolina Day" – 3:43
"If I Only Had a Brain" (Harold Arlen, E.Y. Harburg) – 4:18
"Grandma's Hands" (Bill Withers) – 1:45
"Blind" – 3:16
"Good Friends" – 3:54
"Pajamas" – 2:18
"Get Out of Bed" (Livingston Taylor, Maggie Taylor) – 2:57
"Save Your Heart for Me" (Gary Geld, Peter Udell) – 2:43
"Fifth and Vine" – 2:46
"Bluer Than Blue" (Randy Goodrum) – 2:55
"In My Reply" – 3:46
"Somewhere over the Rainbow" (Harold Arlen, E.Y. Harburg) – 3:40
"Thank You Song" – 1:13

Formats
CD (JD097) Chesky Records
180 gram LP (JR97) Chesky Records

References

1993 albums
Livingston Taylor albums